United States Army National Guard units began forming Aerial Observation units before World War I.  When the United States entered the war in April 1917, about 100 National Guard pilots joined the Aviation Section, U.S. Signal Corps (Later United States Army Air Service).

After the demobilization of the World War I Air Service in 1919, in 1920, the Militia Bureau and the Air Service agreed on forming postwar National Guard aviation units. On 17 January 1921 the 109th Observation Squadron of the Minnesota National Guard became the first postwar air unit to receive federal recognition.  They flew a wide variety of aircraft during the inter-war period.  These included the Curtiss JN-4 "Jenny", Consolidated PT-1 "Trusty", Consolidated PT-3, Northrop BT-1, Douglas O-2 and Consolidated O-17 Courier during 1923–1931; the Douglas O-38 during 1931–1935; and the Douglas O-43 and North American O-47 between 1935 and 1942.

These 29 squadrons (18 of them having a World War I lineage and histories) formed by the Army before World War II remain active Air National Guard units today and are the direct predecessors of today's current units.

Squadrons

* Note:  The "Federal Recognition" date is the effective date the unit was recognized for National Guard Service. Demobilized World War I Air Service units were re-established and re-designated effective that date.

During World War II, these units were federalized and were re-equipped with more modem aircraft.  As part of the Army Air Corps, the units were transformed from observation organizations into reconnaissance, liaison, fighter, and bombardment squadrons. They served in every major combat theater during the war. The most significant wartime contribution of National Guard aviators was to train and lead the large numbers of volunteer airmen who had entered the AAF. That role was epitomized by Lt Col Addison E. Baker, a Guardsman from Akron, Ohio. On 1 August 1943, Baker commanded the VIII Bomber Command's 93d Bombardment Group on a daring but ill-fated low-level attack against enemy oil refineries at Ploesti, Romania. Baker was posthumously awarded the Medal of Honor for his heroic leadership.

See also

 Air National Guard

References

Observation
.Observation
Army National Guard